Collison may refer to:

Collison (surname), includes Collisson
Collison, Illinois, U.S., unincorporated community

See also
Collison House (disambiguation)
Collision (disambiguation)
Colliston, hamlet in Angus, Scotland
Cullison (disambiguation)